Zachary DeVille (born 23 March 1993 in San Diego, California, United States) is a Guamanian international footballer who plays for the Cal State Northridge Matadors and the Guam national team.

Career
Deville played youth soccer for San Diego-based club Nott's Forest FC, not to be confused with Nottingham Forest.

In 2006 attended the St. Augustine Catholic High School in San Diego, CA. After one year joined to the University City High School and played for the Centurions soccer team. Since 2008 played besides San Diego Surf as part of the US Soccer Development Academy. In August 2011 attended the Northridge University.

International
He made his first appearance for the Guam national football team in 2012.

References

External links

1993 births
Living people
Guamanian footballers
Guam international footballers
Cal State Northridge Matadors men's soccer players
Soccer players from San Diego
Association football forwards